Ralph Middleton Munroe (April 3, 1851 – August 20, 1933) was an American yacht designer and early resident of Coconut Grove in South Florida. His home, now The Barnacle Historic State Park, is the oldest house in Miami-Dade County still standing in its original location.

Early life
Munroe was born to Thomas and Ellen Middleton Munroe at their family home on 22nd Street near 4th Avenue in New York City on April 3, 1851. Munroe's grandfather was William Munroe who made the first American lead pencils in 1812. In 1854, the Munroe family moved to Clifton, Staten Island, where Munroe spent his childhood. He lived in a large home at 104 Townsend Avenue. Growing up near the sea, he became fascinated with the boats that were essential to island life. The New York Yacht Club America's Cup Race was held near his childhood home in Clifton. While a student at Eagleswood Military Academy,  near Perth Amboy, New Jersey, from 1861 to 1864, he purchased the Hornet for $2.00, the first of many boats he owned.

After briefly attending Columbia University in New York City, Munroe participated in a number of lucrative business ventures as well as yachting adventures. In 1874, he encountered William Brickell off of the coast of Staten Island, a meeting that changed his life. It was from him that Munroe learned more of Biscayne Bay, which he visited for the first time in 1877.

At age 28, Munroe married Eva Amelia Hewitt in 1879 and established his permanent home at Great Kills, Staten Island] Two years later, she gave birth to a daughter, Edith Munroe. The joy of his daughter's birth was met with tragedy. Within the next few months, Eva contracted tuberculosis and in the hopes of recovery, Munroe brought Eva; her sister, Adeline, also tubercular; and their brother to Biscayne Bay. His daughter Edith died in her grandmother's care shortly after their departure. Eva died in April 1882. She is buried on the grounds of the Coconut Grove Library. This is the oldest marked grave in Miami. A devastated Munroe soon returned to Staten Island.

Move to Florida
Between 1882 and 1886, Munroe returned to Biscayne Bay several times, spending winters with Charles and Isabella Peacock, who were then building the Bay View House, Dade County's first hotel, later renamed the Peacock Inn. He returned to summer in Staten Island each year. In 1886, Munroe decided to make Coconut Grove his permanent home, and purchased the future site of The Barnacle Historic State Park, which was at the time  of bayfront property. He paid $400 in cash in addition to one of his yachts, the Kingfish, which he valued at an additional $400. Two years later, in 1888, he sold his home in Staten Island to remain year round in Coconut Grove.

With his new home began a new life. Munroe built his boathouse directly on the bay in 1887 with living quarters on the upper floor and a workshop on the lower floor. He continued designing yachts, fifty-six of which he completed over the course of his lifetime. His most famous design was Egret, a 28 ft, double-ended sharpie lifeboat which he designed for himself. He obtained a wrecking license from the State of Florida to salvage ships on Biscayne Bay, which were numerous due to the surrounding reef and shallow waters.

After he had settled into his various careers, the always social Munroe founded the Biscayne Bay Yacht Club in 1887. He was the club's first Commodore, a position he held for twenty-two years.

Fully established in every regard but one, Munroe decided to start the construction of his house, "The Barnacle", in 1891. He met his second wife, Jessie Wirth, on a sailing trip in 1894, and they married a year later in 1895. Jessie gave birth to a daughter, Patty, (1900), and a son, Wirth, (1902) who also became a yacht designer. The family took frequent cruises on the bay and the children learned to sail at a very young age.

In 1903, he and his friend Tom Hine established a resort on the property called Camp Biscayne. Guests included Ruth Rowland Nichols, William Grigsby McCormick, and Alexander Graham Bell. Many who wintered at Camp Biscayne later settled in the area permanently as Munroe had.

Munroe's autobiography, The Commodore's Story, was published in 1930. Written with the assistance of Vincent Gilpin, it is one of the few first-hand accounts existing of pioneer days in Miami-Dade County.

Munroe was a very good friend of Captain Nat Herreshoff, America's preeminent yacht designer. Herreshoff spent the last winters of his life residing at a cottage at the Barnacle.

Photography was another important aspect of Munroe's life. He was an accomplished amateur photographer. During his lifetime, many of his photographs were used in magazines, newspapers, and books as illustrations. Three illustrations in Willoughby's Across the Everglades are credited to Munroe. His photographs are the only record of what pioneer days looked like in early Miami. Many of these photographs were published in the book The Forgotten Frontier.

Munroe died on 20 August 1933 at age 82. He was buried in Sleepy Hollow Cemetery, Concord, Massachusetts. He was survived by his wife and two children who, with his other descendants, continued to occupy The Barnacle until 1973 when the family sold it to the state of Florida.

Vessels designed

Proas

Yachts

Note Those in CAPITALS are PRESTO style boats.

References
Notes

Bibliography

  

People from Miami
American yacht designers
1851 births
1933 deaths
People from Great Kills, Staten Island